Máximo Benito Santos Barbosa (15 April 1847 – 19 May 1889) was a Uruguayan political and military figure.

Background
Santos pursued a career in the military, prior to serving as Minister for War from 1880 to 1882. He was a member of the Colorado Party (Uruguay).

In 1882 Miguel Alberto Flangini Ximénez, who served briefly as acting President of Uruguay, stepped down from office.

President of Uruguay (1st term)
Succeeding acting President Flangini, Santos  served as President of Uruguay from 1882 until 1886.

Creation of Flores Department
Among Santos's lasting acts as President was the creation of the Flores Department in the interior of the country, named after assassinated former President of Uruguay General Venancio Flores, who hailed from the territory incorporated as a department.

Other features of his rule
He also in a measure repaired relations with Paraguay.

However, his administration was also widely criticized for failure to root out corruption.

Succession
Santos was succeeded as president by Francisco Antonino Vidal in 1886. Santos served as the President of the Senate of Uruguay in 1886.

President of Uruguay (second interim term)
Subsequently, after relinquishing presidential office in 1886, Santos returned to exercise presidential powers for a number of months in 1886.

Succession
Santos was succeeded as president by his Colorado Party colleague Máximo Tajes, with whom, however, he had poor relations. Tajes was still exercising his presidential office at Santos's death.

Later life; death in exile
Subsequent to the relinquishing of his presidential office for the second time, Santos travelled in Europe, and was unable to return to Uruguay.

Still aged in his early 40s, Santos died in exile in Buenos Aires, Argentina, in 1889.

Legacy
Santos' magnificent residence in downtown Montevideo nowadays is the seat of the Ministry of Foreign Relations of Uruguay and is known as Palacio Santos.  His country estate now houses the Museo de la Memoria, a state-owned museum dedicated to the victims of the Uruguayan dictatorship.

See also
 Colorado Party (Uruguay)#Earlier History
 Politics of Uruguay
 Miguel Alberto Flangini Ximénez#Interim President of Uruguay
 Máximo Tajes#President of Uruguay
 Flores Department#History and cultural heritage

References

External links
 Biography

1847 births
1889 deaths
People from Pando, Uruguay
Presidents of Uruguay
Presidents of the Senate of Uruguay
Colorado Party (Uruguay) politicians
Defence ministers of Uruguay
19th-century Uruguayan people
Uruguayan military personnel